Kalika is a village in Achham District in the Seti Zone of western Nepal. In the 1991 Nepal census, the village had a population of 2944 living in 622 houses. Ten years later, in the 2001 Nepal census, the population was 3250, of which 37% was literate.

References

Populated places in Achham District
Village development committees in Achham District